Francisco Silvestre Espejo Camaño (Siquire, Miranda State, April 16, 1758 – Valencia, Carabobo State, July 15, 1814), was a Venezuelan lawyer who briefly served as the President of Venezuela in 1812 and fought for the republican cause during the Venezuelan War of Independence. His parents were Francisco Espejo and Bárbara Caamaño y Bermúdez.

He was executed by firing squad in 1814.

References

Presidents of Venezuela
People of the Venezuelan War of Independence
1758 births
1814 deaths
People executed by Spain by firing squad
Venezuelan Roman Catholics